Antonio González Álvarez, commonly known as Chuzo (born 28 January 1940), is a Spanish retired footballer who played as a defender.

Club career
Born in Antequera, Málaga, Chuzo made his professional debuts with Atlético Madrid, first appearing in La Liga at the age of just 17. Even though he never played one full schedule during his six-year spell with the capital club, he started in all but one of the games he appeared in.

In the 1962–63 season, after having helped the Colchoneros to back-to-back Copa del Rey trophies and the 1962 UEFA Cup Winners' Cup (he played in the first match of the final against ACF Fiorentina, in Glasgow) Chuzo scored an astonishing nine goals in only 14 matches, with Atlético finishing in second position in the league behind neighbouring Real Madrid.

After winning the European accolade, Chuzo signed for local CD Málaga, playing with the Andalusians during eight years, suffering top flight relegation twice and appearing rarely in his final years. Over the course of ten professional seasons he appeared in 146 games, netting 14 goals.

International career
On 30 October 1960 Chuzo played his first and only game for the Spanish national team, appearing in a 0–3 friendly loss with Austria in Vienna.

Honours

Club
Atlético Madrid
UEFA Cup Winners' Cup: 1961–62
Copa del Generalísimo: 1959–60, 1960–61

Country
Spain U18
UEFA European Under-18 Championship: Runner-up 1957

Personal
Chuzo's hometown of Antequera has named a street after him.

References

External links
 
 National team data at BDFutbol
 
 Stats at Amigos Malaguistas 

1940 births
Living people
People from Antequera
Sportspeople from the Province of Málaga
Spanish footballers
Footballers from Andalusia
Association football defenders
La Liga players
Segunda División players
Atlético Madrid footballers
CD Málaga footballers
Spain youth international footballers
Spain B international footballers
Spain international footballers
CD Antequerano players